José Francisco Torres Mezzell (born October 29, 1987), also known as "Gringo", is an American professional soccer player who plays as a midfielder for USL Championship club Rio Grande Valley FC.

He is usually deployed as a central midfielder but can also play as a full-back. Torres has played for the United States national team.

Early life

Torres was born in Texas to a Mexican father and an American mother.
He played two years for Longview High School and was voted the team's MVP both seasons, with 31 goals and 39 assists in total. After his sophomore year, he was scouted and signed by Mexican club Pachuca.

Club career
Torres was recruited by Pachuca while he was still attending high school in Texas. He broke into the starting lineup during the 2008 Apertura season in central midfield. He appeared in all three matches at the 2008 FIFA Club World Cup for Pachuca, starting twice. In the InterLiga 2009 Final, Torres scored the clinching penalty kick that sent Pachuca through to the Copa Libertadores 2009. In November 2012, he was transferred to Tigres UANL. On December 22, 2012, Torres made his debut with Tigres in a friendly match against Pumas UNAM in the Estadio Universitario. Tigres was the Apertura 2015 champion, and Torres played the second leg of the final.

On November 25, 2020, after more than two years without playing a professional game, Torres joined USL Championship side Colorado Springs Switchbacks ahead of their 2021 season.

On February 21, 2022, Torres signed with USL Championship side Rio Grande Valley FC.

International career
Torres was eligible to choose between representing Mexico, the nation of his father's heritage and where he played club football, or his native United States. Both national federations had been tracking Torres' progress at Pachuca.

Torres was invited by Peter Nowak to play for the United States U-23 team at the 2008 Summer Olympics in Beijing. Torres declined the invitation when Pachuca promised a position in their starting lineup if he stayed with the club. However, only three months later, on October 2, 2008, Torres announced his intention to represent the United States at the international level, and was called in to the U.S. camp by Bob Bradley within days.

He made his U.S. debut against Cuba on October 11, 2008, coming on as a substitute for Heath Pearce in the sixty-eighth minute. He made his first start against Trinidad and Tobago four days later. Torres was also included in the roster that played against Mexico in February 2009, but did not play. He was a member of the U.S. squad for the 2009 Confederations Cup but did not play in the tournament. He was selected to the 23-man roster to represent the United States at the 2010 World Cup in South Africa and started a group stage game against Slovenia.

Torres continued to be a part of the U.S. set up under Bradley's successor, Jürgen Klinsmann, and was part of the qualification cycle for the 2014 FIFA World Cup. Despite being a part of the 2013 Gold Cup winning team, he ended falling outside of Klinsmann's plans, and ultimately was not part of the U.S. team that went to the World Cup in Brazil.

Career statistics

Club

International

Honors
Pachuca
 Primera División de México: Clausura 2007
 CONCACAF Champions League: 2007, 2008, 2009–10
 Copa Sudamericana: 2006
 North American SuperLiga: 2007

Tigres UANL
 Liga MX: Apertura 2015, Apertura 2016, Apertura 2017
 Copa MX: Clausura 2014
 Campeón de Campeones: 2016, 2017

United States
 CONCACAF Gold Cup: 2013

References

External links

1987 births
Living people
People from Longview, Texas
Longview High School alumni
American sportspeople of Mexican descent
United States men's international soccer players
2009 FIFA Confederations Cup players
2010 FIFA World Cup players
2013 CONCACAF Gold Cup players
CONCACAF Gold Cup-winning players
American soccer players
Soccer players from Texas
Liga MX players
American expatriate soccer players
C.F. Pachuca players
Tigres UANL footballers
Association football midfielders
American expatriate sportspeople in Mexico
Colorado Springs Switchbacks FC players
Rio Grande Valley FC Toros players